One of Us Is Lying is an American teen drama mystery television series developed by Erica Saleh. The series is based on the 2017 novel of the same name by Karen M. McManus and follows five high school students who enter detention, where one of them dies under suspicious circumstances and an investigation ensues. It stars Mark McKenna as Simon, the deceased student, and Annalisa Cochrane, Chibuikem Uche, Marianly Tejada, and Cooper van Grootel as the main suspects, with Barrett Carnahan, Jessica McLeod, and Melissa Collazo, Sara Thompson and Alimi Ballard in supporting roles.

The series premiered on Peacock on October 7, 2021, and was met with generally positive reviews from critics. In January 2022, the series was renewed for a second season which premiered on October 20, 2022. In January 2023, the series was canceled after two seasons.

Premise
At Bayview High, five studentsSimon, Addy, Cooper, Bronwyn, and Nateare given detention. Simon, known for starting an online gossip group with his friend Janae to snitch on his classmates, suffers a sudden and fatal allergic reaction. Each of the four students had a motive to kill Simon, and after it is determined his death was not an accident, an investigation ensues.

Cast

Main

 Annalisa Cochrane as Addy Prentiss, a popular cheerleader
 Chibuikem Uche as Cooper Clay, a closeted baseball pitcher with a promising career
 Marianly Tejada as Bronwyn Rojas, an overachiever focused on her future
 Cooper van Grootel as Nate Macauley, a student and drug dealer on probation
 Barrett Carnahan as Jake Riordan, the captain of the football team and Addy's boyfriend
 Jessica McLeod as Janae Matthews, Simon's best friend
 Mark McKenna as Simon Kelleher, the creator of an online gossip group who dies during detention (season 1, guest season 2)
 Melissa Collazo as Maeve Rojas, Bronwyn's younger sister
 Sara Thompson as Vanessa Clark, Addy's best friend and TJ's best friend (season 2, recurring season 1)
 Alimi Ballard as Kevin Clay, Cooper's father and coach (season 2, recurring season 1)

Recurring
 Zenia Marshall as Keely, Cooper's girlfriend
 George Ferrier as TJ Forrester, Jake's best friend who has a crush on Addy
 Martin Bobb-Semple as Evan, Vannessa's boyfriend
 Karim Diane as Kris, Cooper's secret boyfriend
 Jacque Drew as Detective Wheeler
 Valerie Cruz as Isabella Rojas, Bronwyn and Maeve's mother
 Hugo Ateo as Javier Rojas, Bronwyn and Maeve's father (season 1)
 Miles J. Harvey as Lucas Clay, Cooper's younger brother (season 1)
 Ali Liebert as Ann Prentiss, Addy's mother
 Purva Bedi as Principal Gupta
 Andi Crown as Ms. Avery, an AP Physics teacher at Bayview High (season 1)
 Errol Shand as Brad Macauley, Nate's father (season 1)
 Aidee Walker as Ellen Macauley, Nate's mother
 Joe Witkowski as Cole Riordan, Jake's brother (season 2)
 Doralynn Mui as Fiona Jennings, a new student at Bayview (season 2, guest season 1)
 Emma Jenkins-Purro as Giselle Ward (season 2)

Episodes

Season 1 (2021)

Season 2 (2022)

Production

Development

In September 2017, Universal Cable Productions reportedly acquired the rights to One of Us Is Lying—the debut novel of Karen M. McManus—in a competitive situation and would produce a television series adaptation to be released on E!. In August 2019, the project was moved to NBCUniversal, who gave the then-unreleased streaming service Peacock its first pilot order with the series.

Following the success of his Spanish Netflix series Elite, Darío Madrona received several offers to work on American television series; one such offer was for One of Us Is Lying. Madrona thought the show would provide something "a little brighter" than traditional mystery stories and found the novel "super addictive"—he was also intrigued by the flawed and untruthful characters, and saw the project as a chance to explore more profound themes of friendship, love and want. After accepting the offer, Madrona met with the producers and studio and was hired as showrunner.

In September 2019, it was reported that Jennifer Morrison would direct the pilot episode. On August 12, 2020, the project became the first from Peacock to receive a series order. On January 14, 2022, Peacock renewed the series for a second season, with Saleh replacing Madrona as showrunner. On January 20, 2023, Peacock canceled the series after two seasons.

Writing and adaptation
McManus was heavily involved in the process of adapting the novel throughout; she provided input to all the scripts and episodes, but still allowed the writers free rein. McManus stated that her main objective was to keep her characters' emotional cores intact. In an interview, Madrona was asked if the series would stay faithful to its source material; he responded by saying, "We've been faithful to the spirit of the story and the themes and the characters, but also trying to add some little twists and turns here and there so we can surprise readers of the book." Madrona found the idea of a single season that tells a complete story while solving the show's biggest mystery very satisfying. He also claimed that after a season, viewers often lost interest in a show and stopped watching. Because of this, the series reveals who killed Simon, but many other questions are left unanswered at the end of the first season.

The second season deviated from its source material. According to Saleh, the crew were eager to write about the show's characters again and continue the first season's narrative. She did not want to adapt the second book because it stars a different cast of characters, and the team wanted to carry on exploring the original characters. Saleh found it both "exciting and freeing" and "a little nerve-wracking" to write the second season without the novels as a blueprint for the plot. Since the writers knew their audience enjoyed the books and their characters, they wanted to make sure they were "really continuing to deliver on the heart of the characters that [McManus] created". While the first season focuses on themes of living honestly and breaking away from stereotypes, the second emphasises the consequences of doing so.

Casting
In October 2019, Marianly Tejada, Cooper van Grootel, Annalisa Cochrane, Chibuikem Uche, Jessica McLeod, Barrett Carnahan, and Melissa Collazo were announced as part of the cast. In joining the series, van Grootel, Cochrane, and Uche all said they had not heard about the novel before they auditioned. In 2021, Mark McKenna was confirmed as a series regular in July; Martin Bobb-Semple, Karim Diane, George Ferrier, Miles J. Harvey, Zenia Marshall, and Sara Thompson were announced as part of the recurring cast in August; and Alimi Ballard was confirmed in October. In May 2022, Joe Witkowski and Doralynn Mui joined the cast in recurring roles for the second season.

Filming
Filming for the pilot took place in Vancouver, Canada—from November 2 to November 20, 2019. Scenes were shot at several local sites, including Central Park; Blenheim Street; West 53rd Avenue; and a parking lot on Boundary Road. Due to the COVID-19 pandemic, the crew had difficulties restarting production. They decided to film the rest of the show in New Zealand. According to producer Matt Groesch, the beaches on the country's east coast provided an excellent match to those in Southern California. The crew visited many locations, such as Auckland, the North Shore, and Waiwera. Groesch had to figure out a method to replicate the high school setting in Auckland as they had previously been shot elsewhere in the pilot. Several locations were used, including the AUT Millennium and the ASB Showgrounds. The team used Rangitoto College as the backdrop for Bayview High's rival school. The remaining seven episodes started shooting on May 10, 2021. Due to a a COVID-19 lockdown, the last few days of production shifted to Ontario, Canada. Filming concluded in late September 2021. Production returned to New Zealand for the second season.

Reception
The first three episodes premiered on Peacock on October 7, 2021, followed by three episodes on October 14, and the final two episodes of the first season on October 21. 

Before its premiere, critics were given the first three episodes to review. From The Wall Street Journal, John Anderson said the series was difficult to categorize and wrote, "what distinguishes the series as storytelling, is the way it careens its way through its various plot points, unencumbered by the need for explanations or narrative development. We don't need all that. The conclusion will be a surprise, one assumes. But the getting there is, as they might say in French class, déjà vu." Brad Newsome, writing for The Sydney Morning Herald, said the story "deftly tweaks its balance of suspicions to keep things interesting, but it's McKenna and Van Grootel who really pull focus." The Hollywood Reporters Angie Han said the series was missing a spark to set it apart from similar programming, with characters that feel like "archetypes," a "sour, dour mood, with few moments of either levity or raw pain," and dull colors that "keep the show's emotions at arm's length. The story moves forward at a painless pace, and the characters are easy enough to like, if not really interesting enough to love. But without any notable quirks or deep insights, it's also a show that seems likely to disappear from memory as soon as that binge is over."

References

External links
 
 

One of Us Is Lying
2020s American high school television series
2020s American LGBT-related drama television series
2020s American mystery television series
2020s American teen drama television series
2021 American television series debuts
2022 American television series endings
American thriller television series
English-language television shows
Peacock (streaming service) original programming
Television series about social media
Television series about teenagers
Television series by Universal Content Productions
Television shows about murder
Television shows based on American novels
Television shows filmed in New Zealand